Tuguegarao ( or ),  officially the City of Tuguegarao, is a 3rd class component city and capital of the province of Cagayan, Philippines. According to the 2020 census, it has a population of 166,334 people, making it the most populous city in Cagayan Valley and Northeastern Luzon.

A major urban center and primary growth center in the Northeastern Luzon, it is the regional center of Cagayan Valley and also its regional institutional and administrative center. One of the fast emerging cities in the Philippines, the city is a convergence area for the provinces of Cagayan, Kalinga, Apayao and northern Isabela.

Dubbed as the “Gateway to the Ilocandia and the Cordilleras,” the city is located on the southern border of the province where the Pinacanauan River empties into the Cagayan River. It is surrounded by the Sierra Madre Mountains to the east, Cordillera Mountains to the west, and the Caraballo Mountains to the south.

The highest temperature ever recorded in the Philippines——hit Tuguegarao on May 11, 1969.

Etymology
There are several legends about the origin of the name. One is a species of palm tree called taraw in the area and another is garao in reference to the "swift river current."

The most accepted version is the Ibanags' reply to the Spaniards when the latter asked for the name of the place — Tuggi gari yaw ("this was cleared by fire").

On the other hand, historical evidence that might provide clues to the origin of the city's name comes from the fact that in 1591, the place was listed as a Spanish encomienda, which was originally a pre-colonial settlement called Tubigarao.

History

Tuguegarao was founded on May 9, 1604, as a "mission-pueblo" with the new vicar Fray Tomas Villa, O.P. initiating the construction of a temporary church housing Sts. Peter and Paul as patron saints. In the 1720s, Father Antonio Lobato, O.P. developed a layout of street network together with the construction of the cathedral. In 1839, the provincial capital was transferred to Tuguegarao from Lal-lo as the Cagayan-Manila road opened which spurred socio-economic progress.

The town was occupied by American troops on December 12, 1899. Drastic improvements in Tuguegarao were discerned over the course of provincial administrations—the first Provincial Capitol was completed in 1909, a town hall and public market were built, the provincial high school—Cagayan High School—was founded in a former private residence, and the Cagayan Valley College of Arts & Trades was founded by American educator Claude Andrews.

During World War II, the city and its airfield of some significance was captured by the Japanese Imperial Army on December 12, 1941, as part of the Japanese invasion of Aparri. The General Headquarters of the 11th Infantry Regiment, Philippine Commonwealth Army, USAFIP-NL was activated on 1942 to 1946 and stationed in Tuguegarao.

Sitio Capatan was elevated into a barrio (or barangay) of Tuguegarao on April 3, 1959, by Republic Act No. 2107.

In 1975, Tuguegarao was declared as the capital and seat of the regional government of Cagayan Valley (Region II) being the region's geographic center with adequate facilities and amenities needed by such. Multistory buildings were constructed in the poblacion greatly changing Tuguegarao's skyline in the 1980s and 1990s.

Hotel Delfino siege

On March 4, 1990, former colonel and suspended Cagayan governor Rodolfo Aguinaldo seized the Hotel Delfino using his private army of about 300 men. Aguinaldo stood accused of supporting the Dec. 1–9, 1989 coup attempt against President Corazon Aquino.  Brigadier General Oscar Florendo, armed forces chief of Civil Military Relations, was sent to Tuguegarao by Aquino to serve Aguinaldo with an arrest warrant. After Aguinaldo's men seized control of Hotel Delfino where the general was staying, Florendo was taken hostage along with more than 50 other hotel guests. Florendo was eventually shot inside the hotel and died of his wounds. Following hours of standoff between the two sides, nearly 1,000 government troops launched an attack to dislodge Aguinaldo's forces from the hotel. During this melee, Aguinaldo fled with about 90 fighters for mountains in the north and went into hiding for several months until he surrendered, only to be cleared of all legal charges by winning reelection in 1992.

Cityhood

Tuguegarao became a component city by virtue of Republic Act 8755 dated November 4, 1999, followed by a plebiscite held on December 18, 1999. Randolph Ting was the first mayor of the new city. On July 2, 2007, Ting's father, businessman and former municipal mayor Delfin Telan Ting, was elected as the city's second mayor. After the 25-year political dominance of the Tings, however, retired police general Jefferson Soriano won over re-electionist Delfin Ting in the 2013 local elections. However, Soriano's term was marked by multiple charges of corruption that saw him being and reinstated several times over his nine years in office. Eventually, he was defeated by Maila Ting-Que, daughter of Delfin Ting, in his 4th reelection bid in the 2022 local elections. This made Ting-Que the first woman to be elected mayor of the city.

Geography
Tuguegarao's location is in the southern portion of the province. The city is bordered by Iguig to the north; to the west by the Cagayan River and Solana; Peñablanca to the east; and to the south by Enrile and San Pablo, Isabela. The river delta city is almost encapsulated by the Cagayan River in the western and southern side, which explains for its northward expansion, and the Pinacanauan River, a tributary of Cagayan River, in the eastern part. Small bodies of waters are found in the city, such as the Balzain Creek which spans the barangays of Caritan Sur and Balzain. Currently, the creek is continuously drying up due to eutrophication and the uncontrollable growth of water lilies.

Historically, the town was inhabited by Irayas and Itawes who lived and mainly relied on fishing, farming, hunting and livestock raising. In addition, ancient natives have ventured on weaving cloth and making of household and farm implements.

Cagayan is divided into three congressional districts, wherein the city is included in the Third District together with the other 6 southern municipalities.

Barangays
Tuguegarao is politically subdivided and comprises into 49 barangays. These barangays are headed by elected officials: Barangay Captain, Barangay Council, whose members are called Barangay Councilors. All are elected every three years.

The three most populous are Ugac Sur, Ugac Norte and Cataggamman Nuevo. More than half are classified as urban barangays with some having a combination of commercial, residential and agricultural sites. Rural barangays are mostly agricultural territories.

Climate

Tuguegarao experiences a tropical monsoon climate (Am), with only a slight difference between summer and winter temperatures, and high year-round humidity.

Thus, the city was tagged as the "Hottest City in the Philippines". Unusually, in months—usually lasts from December to February—where the cool northeast monsoon or locally as amihan surges, temperatures in the city drop to as low as —in 2017—especially in early mornings. Locals parallel the chills felt with that in Baguio.

Demographics
It is the most populous and densest city in the Cagayan Valley region. Most of the inhabitants are Ilocanos, Ibanags and Itawes. Some are of Chinese and Indian descent.

Religion 

Due to a history of Spanish and other foreign missions, Christianity, in the form of Roman Catholicism, is the predominant religion in Tuguegarao.
The present Roman Catholic Archdiocese was chiseled from the Archdiocese of Nueva Segovia formerly located in Lal-lo (Nueva Segovia). It was initially created as a diocese on April 10, 1910, and elevated as an Archdiocese by Pope Paul VI on September 21, 1974. It has jurisdiction over suffragan bishops of Bayombong, Ilagan and Batanes.

The seat of the Roman Catholic Archdiocese is at St. Peter Metropolitan Cathedral, one of the largest churches in the region.

There are also Protestants, Baptist, Church of Christ, Adventists, Born Again groups, the Church of Jesus Christ of Latter-day Saints, Jehovah's Witnesses,and Philippine-based groups like Iglesia ni Cristo and Members Church of God International that accounts to the city's population. These religious organizations have their own temples and churches sparsely located in the city. Some are Islam where their mosque is found in Centro 10 (Riverside).

Economy

Within the past three decades, its economy gradually shifted from agriculture to trading, commerce and services. The shift was ushered by Tuguegarao's role as the Regional Government Center and Center of Commerce in Northern Luzon. In early 2016, Tuguegarao City was named as one of the ten emerging cities in the 2015 Next Wave Cities report, conducted by Department of Science and Technology - Information and Communications Technology Office (DOST-ICTO).

On June 30, 2020, the Department of Information and Communications Technology (DICT), in partnership with the IT and Business Process Association of the Philippines (IBPAP) and Leechiu Property Consultants (LPC), named Tuguegarao as one of the 25 "digital cities" poised to be prospect growth areas of the information technology and business process management (IT-BPM) sector in the country by 2025.

Currently, Tuguegarao City has two major public markets, namely, the Don Domingo Public Market — located in the upper part of Poblacion serving as the convergence of agricultural and aquatic products from neighboring towns and provinces — and the Tuguegarao City Commercial Center — formerly known as Mall of the Valley and is located at the Central Business District, receiving the highest daily foot traffic.

Retail and business process outsourcing
Large retail operators have shown significant interest to the growth and increase of land value in cities throughout the Philippines. They are seen as highly developed urban centers where a lot of economic activities take place, and is important to urbanization and development. Tuguegarao is eyed as a center of exponential growth for commerce, industry and service, strengthening its stature as the capital of the Cagayan Valley Region.

SM Prime, the largest retail operator in the country, opened SM Center Tuguegarao Downtown on October 12, 2017, as its first mall in the city and in Cagayan. Its second mall, SM City Tuguegarao, opened on November 18, 2022, marketed as the largest mall in the Cagayan Valley Region.

On July 26, 2018, rival Robinsons Land Corporation opened the mixed-use complex shopping mall Robinsons Place Tuguegarao as the first full-service mall in Cagayan, including a Go Hotels branch, the first in the region. A few kilometers away from Robinsons Place Tuguegarao, DoubleDragon Properties, a subsidiary of SM Investments Corporation, started constructing CityMall Tuguegarao at last quarter of 2017 and opened on March 1, 2021, its first in the region.

Other notable shopping centers include the Tuguegarao City Commercial Center, formerly known as the Mall of the Valley; FCI Citimall, the first shopping mall in Northern Luzon; Brickstone Mall; Primark Town Center Tuguegarao, former site of Paseo Reale Mall; Unitop Mall Tuguegarao; Mart One Department Store and more.

Following the opening of 7 Eleven stores in Nueva Vizcaya, and Isabela provinces, the Philippine Seven Corporation expanded its reach to the Cagayan with its two branches in the city at College Avenue, near University of Cagayan Valley and at the new Valley Hotel Tower Mall in Balzain, now there are more than 8 Branches of 7 Eleven stores around the city.

The city has seen a significant growth of auto-hub companies with the presence of car showrooms in the city. Car brands such as Mitsubishi, Hyundai, Nissan, Isuzu, and Toyota have set up their dealerships in the different parts of the city, mostly located along the major highways of the urbanity. The largest of which is from Toyota located at Carig Sur near the city hall.

The City Government of Tuguegarao, through the city's Information and Communications Technology (ICT) Council hosted a meeting with IT-BPO companies Sitel Philippines Inc. and Lee Chiu Property Consultants, Inc. in September 2018 to discuss the possibilities of locating their companies in the city. Initial steps have been made for the establishment of an IT park and a township where BPO companies could locate.

Banking and real estate
Tuguegarao City, as the seat of the regional capital of Cagayan Valley, houses the regional headquarters of the Bangko Sentral ng Pilipinas located at the Regional Government Center in Carig Sur. As of 2019, a total of 53 banks are operating in the city such as BPI, BDO, Chinabank, RCBC, EastWest, UnionBank, Robinsons Bank, PNB, Bank of Commerce, Landbank, UCPB, Philippine Postal Savings Bank and others.

Major real estate developers Ayala Land — Avida Settings Tuguegarao — and Vista Land — Camella Tuguegarao, Lessandra Cagayan and the expansion of Camella Cagayan (soon Camella Cagayan Trails) — are constructing their housing developments in Cagayan Valley. New condominiums developments are in the city these are Bayani Hall Lecaros, Bayani Hall Twin Towers developed by Vester Corporation and Rosevale Towers developed by Vista Estates.

The North Gateway Business Park is an  mixed-use township development project located in Barangay Carig Sur, near the Regional Government Center. Launched on February 4, 2020, by real estate developer DataLand, it will feature a mixed-use superblock of retail shops, transport terminal, hotel and residential condominiums and a business park for BPO companies, financial institutions and major corporations.

Metro Tuguegarao 
In May 2019, the National Economic and Development Authority Regional Development Council - Region 2 worked with consulting firms Pacific Rim Innovation and Management Exponents, Inc. (PRIMEX), Engineering and Development Corporation of the Philippines (EDCOP) and the Key Engineer Corporation to prepare a master plan for spurring economic growth in the Metro Tuguegarao zone. The metropolitan area, known as PIEST, includes the four municipalities of Peñablanca, Iguig, Enrile, Solana and the city of Tuguegarao. A situation analysis made by the consultative bodies found out that agriculture, water resource and tourism sectors were some of the "unutilized potentials" seen as key in the development of the area. Developments were extended in Metro Area having the Wilcon Depot Iguig, Isuzu Iguig, Puregold Solana, 7 Eleven Solana and the new bridge that will connect the commerce of Solana and the Tuguegarao this bridge will help to decongest the traffic flow of Buntun Bridge and more proposed and developments of infrastructures, commerce for the Metro Area.

Government

Local government
Tuguegarao City is governed by a city mayor, designated as local chief executive, and by a Sangguniang Panlungsod, composed of the vice mayor and the members of the Sangguniang Panlungsod, as the legislative body, in accordance with the Local Government Code. They are voted to office through an election, held every after three years. As a component city, the provincial government of Cagayan has political jurisdiction over local transactions of the city government.

Elected officials

Controversy
On February 10, 2017, then Mayor Jefferson P. Soriano stepped down from office following an order from the Ombudsman to dismiss him for grave misconduct, which stemmed from anomalous purchases made when he was still the comptroller of the Philippine National Police. Soriano voluntarily called the Department of the Interior and Local Government (DILG) to facilitate the turn over of the mayoralty office to then Vice Mayor Bienvenido de Guzman II. After about seven months, following the order of the Court of Appeals Fourth Division (CA) for "immediate" reinstatement of Mayor Jefferson P. Soriano, on September 6, 2017, Soriano took oath of office. The CA disagreed to the Ombudsman's dismissal order—stating that he committed grave misconduct—and that the mayor only committed simple misconduct. According to the decision, he should only be penalized with three months suspension instead of dismissal from service.

Culture

The Afi Festival is an annual festival every August, celebrated in commemoration of the city's patron saint, San Jacinto de Polonia whose feast day falls on August 16. It came from the Ybanag word afi, meaning fire.

The concept of the "Afi" started in 2014, renaming the former Pav-vurulun Festival. It reiterates and reaffirms the origins of the city's name. Stories say the place where the city center now stands was once “a wilderness that was cleared by fire” through kaingin (slash and burn farming). The main event of the celebration is its opening day, where thousands of students convene for a field demonstration at night as torchbearers. In 2017, 3500 students from Cagayan National High School and Cagayan State University - College of Human Kinetics danced with torches at the sports complex. The city is attempting to beat Indonesia's world record of 3,777 torchbearers in the festival's next edition.

Other highlights of the weeklong celebration include the street dancing competition and drum and lyre competition, where various elementary and secondary schools participate, everyone clad in vibrant costumes and props. Both are usually held at the city's central business district on Bonifacio Street (Calle Commercio). Other events include the Bangkarera competition, a rowing competition in two categories which aims to promote sustainable fishing along the Pinacanauan River, which flows to the Cagayan River, a pansit festival featuring a pansit-eating contest, a Nuang Karera (Carabao race), a Kabayu Karera (horse race), among others.

Before the additions and revisions to the native festival, there was Maskota Festival. Also called the Dance of Lovemaking, it features Maskota, a wedding dance prevalent in the provinces of Cagayan and Isabela, with movements described as "spontaneous, lively and extravagantly expressive." It was danced to the rhythm of the verso with the sincosinco accompaniment. Back then, indigenous materials were utilized for the costumes. Materials come from various local harvests such as coconut sprouts, betel nuts, corn leaves and atchuetes, which serves as natural coloring.

Pancit Batil Potun, widely known as Pancit Batil Patung, is a popular local noodle dish which directly translates to "pancit, beaten egg soup and egg on top." Several panciterias mushroom in all the city's corners, each with distinct styles of cooking and ingredients—miki, egg, minced carabao meat, vegetables and other specific toppings of choice. The city is also known for its own version of longganisa characterized with its salty and garlicky taste with variations using either pork or carabao meat.

Tourism 

The Cagayan Museum and Historical Research Center houses an extensive collection of various artifacts and antiques of the province. In addition to animal fossils found in the valley, it houses extensive data on the discovery of Callao Man by the National Museum. Formerly located in the Cagayan Provincial Capitol Complex, it has moved to the renovated historic provincial jail known as Tribunal de Tuguegarao. In front of the provincial museum is the century-old Rizal Park which is also refurbished.

Tuguegarao boasts elaborate Spanish-built churches such as the Ermita de Piedra de San Jacinto, known to locals as the San Jacinto Church which houses the city's patron saint. It is an elevated chapel built by Dominican friars in 1604 regarded as the oldest brick structure in the city. The St. Peter Metropolitan Cathedral is the biggest Spanish colonial church in Cagayan Valley which was construction from 1761 to 1767 under the supervision of Fr. Antonio Lobato, OP. It is the seat of the Archdiocese of Tuguegarao. Both churches underwent reconstruction due to damages brought by World War II.

Located in Barangay Centro 09, often called Bagumbayan by locals, is the Horno ruins, a Spanish-era brick kiln used to fire bricks for colonial structures including those in the Cathedral and San Jacinto Church.

St. Paul University Philippines was founded in 1907 as Colegio de San Pablo With the arrival of the Sisters of St. Paul of Chartres in Cagayan Valley. It served as a military garrison and hospital of the Japanese during the World War. Throughout the years, it has since become identified internationally having been the first private university in the Philippines to be ISO 9001 certified in 2000 by TÜV Rheinland.

Construction began in 1960 and was opened to traffic in 1969, linking the city to the second and third district municipalities of Cagayan and Apayao.

While tourist spots are sparse in the city, it has become the usual jump-off point of tourists to other destinations in the province such as the Callao Cave and Calvary Hills in neighboring towns Peñablanca and Iguig respectively.

Infrastructure

The city hosts a number of event centers which allow the city to host many provincial and regional gatherings such as the Cagayan Sports Complex, Tuguegarao City Peoples' Gymnasium and the Cagayan Coliseum.

The water system of Tuguegarao is administered by the Metropolitan Tuguegarao Water District, which also serves the nearby municipalities such as Iguig and Solana. Meanwhile, electric services are provided by Cagayan Electric Cooperative which has its office in Solana, Cagayan. Telecommunication services are primarily offered by huge telephone companies such as PLDT and Bayantel, while mobile services are handled by Globe Telecom, Smart Communications, Dito Telecommunity, Sun Cellular, Touch Mobile, and Talk N' Text. High-speed DSL and optical Internet subscriptions are offered by RBC Cable, PLDT and Globe Telecom.

Tuguegarao City houses the headquarters of the Philippine National Police in Cagayan Valley in Camp Marcelo A. Adduru in Alimannao Hills. As the region's institutional center, it is home to the majority of regional government offices concentrated in the Regional Government Center, Barangay Carig Sur.

Transportation
Transportation and infrastructure plays a major role in keeping the Tuguegarao's economy up and running and nearby towns in play. Due to continued growth, daytime population in the city has increased with primary reasons for commuting for commerce, work and notably education due to the city's being known for having several institutions. Over the years, Tuguegarao evolved, expanded and grew, so did its transportation network to keep up with the growing demands of people for ease of access to reliable methods and transit flexibility.

Air

The Tuguegarao Airport handles domestic flights within the Philippines and serves the general area of Tuguegarao and its surrounding municipalities, and is capable of handling Boeing-737-sized aircraft. It is one of the top 20 busiest airports in the country and classified by the Civil Aviation Authority of the Philippines as a Principal Class 1 domestic airport. Cebu Pacific, Sky Pasada and PAL Express are the domestic airlines which operate routes to and from the city. As of 2017, the airport is undergoing rehabilitation and expansion consisting of terminal upgrades and widening of runway, for night landing capabilities, and taxiway.

A proposed international airport, serving the Cagayan Valley Region, will be constructed at the eastern portion of the city—somewhere in barangays Dadda or Tagga—as suggested by City Mayor Bienvenido de Guzman II and former mayor Atty. Jefferson Soriano. Originally, as proposed by the Cagayan Governor Manuel Mamba, the airport was to be located at the tri-boundary area of Tuao, Piat and Solana towns but was later shelved after a forum.

Land
 
A cultural icon of the Philippines with a unique design, Tuguegarao's tricycles offer shared vehicle for hire services for small groups of passengers on a common route over short distances.

Tuguegarao also serves as a vital hub for local, regional and national transportation. Buses operate regional routes from Tuguegarao to Baggao, Aparri, Santiago, Baguio, and many neighboring cities, towns and municipalities. It also is an end-of-the-line stop for many coaches running inter-city and national routes mostly coming from Metro Manila such as GV Florida, Victory Liner, Dalin Bus Liner, Five Star, First North Luzon Transit to name a few.

To the east side are UV Express vans that ply north and south towards Claveria, Santa Praxedes, Aparri, Santa Ana, Alcala, Lasam and Junction Luna, Abulug in Cagayan, Santiago, Roxas, Ilagan and Cauayan in Isabela, Luna and Kabugao in Apayao. There are also mini buses plying to Lasam, Allacapan, Claveria, Santiago and Roxas. Then to the west are jeepneys with routes to Iguig, Tuao, Enrile, Tabuk and Rizal in Kalinga and some mountainous and inland barrios including Callao, all of which lie on the west side of the river.

Kalesas run within the city, mostly near popular points of interest, and are part of the city's tourism but most of these are limited within the downtown area. Taxis are the newest mode of public transportation which are routed from the city to any point in Region 2.

Main roads
Regional transport in Tuguegarao is vulnerable given its lack of distribution of arterial roads and inadequate traffic engineering planning and discipline.

The Buntun Highway-Luna Street network is a major four-lane road network of Tuguegarao that forms part of National Route 51 (N51). It is the only road that serves west-side traffic to Tuguegarao. It links Tuguegarao to the western side of the Cagayan River via the Buntun Bridge, further towns from the west side most notably the municipalities of Solana and Enrile, the Philippine highway network and the Santiago-Tuguegarao Road.
The Balzain Highway-Cagayan Valley Road is another major four-lane road network of Tuguegarao, part of Cagayan Valley Road that comes through Balzain and Carig, that forms part of the Asian Highway 26. It is the only road that serves north-bound traffic to Tuguegarao coming from the east side of the Cagayan River and most of Cagayan Valley. It also links Tuguegarao to surrounding municipalities, most notably Iguig and Peñablanca. These two main arterial networks serves as the backbone for the majority of Tuguegarao's internal and inter-regional transportation.
The Tuguegarao City West Diversion Road is an  four-lane road under construction which starts from Barangay Carig traversing Barangays Linao, Atulayan, Bagay and Buntun, aiming to decongest the Tuguegarao highway and provide alternative routes to nearby municipalities like Solana. The road project is divided into four phases expected to be completed by 2022.

Healthcare

Being the regional center, Tuguegarao hosts major hospitals which serve people in the Cagayan Valley region. Cagayan Valley Medical Center, the largest medical facility in the Cagayan Valley with a bed capacity of 500, is situated in the city. The largest privately owned facility in the region is the 250-bed Dr. Ronald P. Guzman Medical Center, a tertiary level hospital. St. Paul University Philippines has an affiliate hospital in Tuguegarao, the St. Paul Hospital. Cagayan's oldest existing private hospital, the Dr. Domingo S. De Leon General Hospital, formerly Clinica De Leon, is also situated in the city.

Other hospitals in the city are the government-owned and run Tuguegarao City People's General Hospital and the Holy Infant Hospital as well as the privately owned Divine Mercy Wellness Center.

Education

Due to its high incidence of universities, Tuguegarao has been dubbed as the Center of Education in Cagayan Valley. It is home to prestigious and internationally recognized schools such as St. Paul University Philippines — the main campus of the St. Paul University System — and the University of Saint Louis Tuguegarao — one of the CICM schools. Ateneo de Tuguegarao, the country's fifth Ateneo ran by the Society of Jesus, was established in 1945 but eventually closed in 1962 with the Jesuit exodus.

Two of the top state universities are also in Tuguegarao City — the CSU Athena (Andrews Campus), and CSU Red Eagle (Carig Campus) — producing national topnotchers in board examinations. Both universities have their own administration and are separated from each other.

Other schools in the city include the University of Cagayan Valley, John Wesley College, Medical Colleges of Northern Philippines - International School of Asia and Pacific, F.L. Vargas College, Maila Rosario College, Credo Domine College, City Technological Institute, Cagayan Metropolitan Institute of Technology, STI College, AMA Computer College, and other educational institutions.

The Technical Education and Skills Development Authority (TESDA) was established through the enactment of the Technical Education and Skills Development Act of 1994, which encourages the full participation of and mobilize the industry, labor, local government units, and technical-vocational institutions in the skills development of the country's human resource. The TESDA complex and facilities are located in Carig Norte. Numerous technological and vocational institutes can also be found in the city.

Tuguegarao has one Jesuit educational institution located along Bagay Road—the Global Reformed University.

Other notable schools in the city include Cagayan National High School, the oldest and biggest secondary school in the region in terms of student population, Tuguegarao City Science High School, a state-owned secondary institution, Ke Bing School, a private Chinese school, Methodist Christian School, a Christian school in Central Business District, and Saint Claire Montesorri, a catholic school in San Gabriel. The state-owned secondary institution of Tuguegarao City West High School started operations on June 4, 2012.

Students from different countries like China, Congo, India, Nepal, Nigeria, Pakistan and South Korea come to study at the city's universities. Most of the students come to study undergraduate and graduate degrees in sciences.

Media

TV Stations
GMA Tuguegarao Channel 7 
PTV Tuguegarao Channel 12
GTV Tuguegarao Channel 27
RJTV Tuguegarao Channel 29
TV5 Tuguegarao Channel 39
GNN Tuguegarao Channel 47
One Sports Tuguegarao Channel 49
UNTV Tuguegarao Channel 51
The Northern Forum - Cagayan Valley

Cable & Satellite TV
RBC Cable Master System
Clearview Cable TV System
Cignal TV
Sky Direct

Radio
AM Stations:
DZRH Nationwide 576 (Manila Broadcasting Company)
DZCV 684 Radyo Sanggunian (Filipinas Broadcasting Network)
DWPE Radyo Pilipinas Tuguegarao 729 (Philippine Broadcasting Service)
DZYT Sonshine Radio Tuguegarao 765 (Sonshine Media Network International)
DZGR Bombo Radyo Tuguegarao 891 (People's Broadcasting Service)

FM Stations:
Barangay FM 89.3 Tuguegarao (GMA Network, Inc.)
91.7 Magik FM (Century Broadcasting Network)
92.5 Brigada News FM Tuguegarao (Brigada Mass Media Corporation)
94.1 Love Radio Tuguegarao (Manila Broadcasting Company)
94.9 FMR Cagayan (Philippine Collective Media Corporation)
96.5 RJ FM Tuguegarao (Relay station of RJ FM 100.3 Manila by Rajah Broadcasting Network)
100.5 Big Sound FM Tuguegarao (Vanguard Radio Network)
101.5 Radio Maria Cagayan (Radio Maria Philippines)
104.5 XFM Tuguegarao (Apollo Broadcast Investors/Yes2Health Advertising, Inc.)
105.3 Radyo Pangkaunlaran Cagayan (Department of Agriculture & Philippine Broadcasting Service)

Notable personalities

Entertainment
 Charlie Dizon, actress and TV host of ABS-CBN Star Magic.
 Ralph Guzman, broadcaster and journalist

Military
 Eulogio Balao, former soldier and politician
 Noel A. Coballes, retired lieutenant general and Commanding General of the Philippine Army (2013-2014)
 Benito Antonio T. de Leon, retired AFP military officer

Religion
 Ricardo Baccay, Archbishop elect of the Archdiocese of Tuguegarao, former third bishop of the Diocese of Alaminos, and former auxiliary Bishop of the Archdiocese of Tuguegarao.

Sports
 Rommel Adducul, former professional basketball player and coach
 Philip Butel, Caloocan Supremos basketball player
 Rachelle Anne Cabral, archer in the 2012 Summer Olympics

Gallery

References

External links

 [ Philippine Standard Geographic Code]
 

 
Cities in Cagayan Valley
Populated places in Cagayan
Provincial capitals of the Philippines
Populated places established in 1604
1604 establishments in the Philippines
Populated places on the Rio Grande de Cagayan
Component cities in the Philippines